Mawazine (meaning "rhythms of the world") is a Moroccan International music festival held annually in Rabat, Morocco, featuring many international and local music artists. The festival is presided over by Mounir Majidi, the personal secretary of the Moroccan King Mohammed VI and founder and president of Maroc Culture, the cultural foundation that organizes Mawazine and other events.

The 2013 festival was attended by an estimated 2.5 million people, making Mawazine the largest festival in the world after Donauinselfest in Vienna. With 90 acts on 7 stages it has the highest ratio of attendees per stage in the world.

Mawazine is one of several events which are intended to promote an image of Morocco as a tolerant nation, and a post on the event's website declares that the goal of the festival is to promote Rabat as a city open to the world. It has nonetheless sparked controversy, and some Moroccan politicians have criticised the event for "encouraging immoral behaviour," as well as critiquing its purported financing by Moroccan state-owned companies or private companies whose only client is the Moroccan state.

Artists such as Whitney Houston, Mariah Carey, Rod Stewart, Charles Aznavour, Stevie Wonder, Alicia Keys, Shakira, Rihanna, Justin Timberlake, Jennifer Lopez, Enrique Iglesias, Demi Lovato, Christina Aguilera, Ricky Martin, Pharrell Williams, Iggy Azalea, Bruno Mars, Wiz Khalifa, Pitbull, Kanye West, Scorpions, La Fouine, Maître Gims, Damso, Booba, French Montana, Usher, Avicii, Akon, David Guetta, DJ Snake, Hardwell, Placebo, The Chainsmokers, Maroon 5, The Jacksons, Sugababes, Chic, Evanescence, Chris Brown, Luis Fonsi, Nick Jonas, Stromae, Jason Derulo, Juanes, Lenny Kravitz, The Weeknd, Kylie Minogue, Ellie Goulding, Sting, Julio Iglesias, Ennio Morricone, Robert Plant, Cat Stevens, B.B. King, Susana Baca, Carlos Santana, Elton John, Deep Purple and Travis Scott have performed at Mawazine.

History
The festival has known two eras. The first spanned between 2001 and 2007, when it was dedicated to the music of the world genre. The event had some financial difficulties and was struggling to find sponsors. The second era, which started in 2008, has seen Mounir Majidi, the personal secretary of the Moroccan King, take over the event. During this period, the festival started programming more mainstream music, and has become much stronger financially with many sponsorships from large Moroccan businesses. The press reported that the list of artists performing in the event is validated by Mohammed VI.

Funding controversy
In Morocco, the funding of the festival has often been the target of criticism. According to critics, the festival has been funded through state-owned companies such as CDG, OCP, ONCF and Royal Air Maroc, money which they deem can be better spent in sectors such as health/education/unemployment. In 2011, the management of Mawazine declared that budget of the festival is around 62 million Dirhams, of which 27 million is provided by sponsors and 35 million from revenues of the event. They added that only 4 million dirham is given by Rabat's city council.

JLEC (Jorf Lasfar Energy Company), a Morocco-based subsidiary of Taqa, appeared in 2010 as a major sponsor of the event on the festival's official website. In January 2011, Peter Barker-Homek, CEO of Taqa between 2006 and October 2009, declared in a letter sent to the Securities Exchange Commission, that he was instructed to donate $5 million/year to Hassan Bouhemou, CEO of SNI (holding company controlled by the Moroccan royal family), the sum was allegedly going to fund the music festival. In the letter Barker states that he was unconvinced of the utility of such donation, and inquired Taqa's Chairman al-Suwaidi about it, the latter stated that in return for the payment Taqa would get the green light to expand its energy plant in the country. JLEC holds a 30 years contract with Morocco's main electricity distributor ONE, and supplies as much as 50% of the country's electricity needs according to its management.

Hassan Bouhemou, denied being involved in any way in the organisation of the festival or its management and Aziz Daki director of the festival declared that the amounts reported by Barker are incorrect. According to Telquel JLEC donated 10 million Dirhams to Mawazine, replacing Emirati firm Maabar as a major sponsor of the event in 2010.

2009 stampede

Eleven people were killed and forty were injured in a stampede at the "Hay Nahda stadium" during the festival shortly after midnight on 24 May 2009. The incident occurred when spectators attempted to leave in a hurry near the end of a free concert by Moroccan star Abdelaziz Stati. A wire fence collapsed during this attempt, endangering the lives of the 70,000 spectators. The concert had begun at 23:00, later than billed, and this caused people attending other concerts, including one by Stevie Wonder, to go to the stadium when their concerts were finished.

Eight of the victims were seriously injured. Five of the dead were women, four were men and two were teenagers. They were all discovered after the stampede had completed and found to have been crushed by suffocation. Survivors had to be pulled from the wreckage by rescuers. The dead were all Moroccan. Seven people were still in hospital the following day.

Hassan Lamrani, the Governor of Rabat, blamed concert-goers for the stampede, saying that they had "decided to go over the metal barriers to have a quick exit". There were 3,000 police on duty at the event. Maroc Cultures issued a statement to express "its great sorrow", extending "its profound and sincere condolences" to those affected by the tragedy. King Mohammed VI also sent the families of those affected messages of condolence and offered to pay for funeral services and hospital costs. Morocco's interior ministry has announced it will investigate the incident.

2024 Return 
After 3 years stoppage due to the spread of the COVID-19 pandemic, the Maroc Culture Association confirmed the return of the Mawazine festival in 2024 for its 19th edition.

2008 
Mawazine was attended by 1.2 million people and was located in nine venues across Rabat.
The festival featured many artists from all around the globe, including Whitney Houston, Juanes, Goran Bregovic, George Benson, Hoba Hoba Spirit, Tony Allen and Issac Delgado.

2009 
The 2009 festival, a nine-day event entitled "Rhythms of the World", was the eighth edition and began on 15 May, attracting crowds of one million people from cities such as Casablanca, Marrakech, Fez and Tangiers to Rabat. Admission cost between 100 and 500 dirhams (15 to 70 USD). 1700 performers performed in 2009.

The opening three days featured acts such as Kylie Minogue, Alicia Keys, Stevie Wonder, K'naan, Hoba Hoba Spirit, Cheb Khaled, Najwa Karam, Warda Al-Jazairia, Ali Campbell (formerly of UB40), and Johnny Clegg of White Zulu. Other musical acts to feature include Mali's Amadou & Mariam, Cuban musician Eliades Ochoa, The Joubran Trio, three brothers from Palestine, and Iranian ensemble Eshtiaq.

The festival opened with a concert by Ennio Morricone, accompanied by a Moroccan choir with ninety members, on the Bouregreg stage. This was followed by a Kylie Minogue performance on the OLM Souissi stage. Khaled's concert was attended by 50,000 people, whilst 40,000 and 30,000 attendance figures were registered for Kylie Minogue and Warda respectively. Stevie Wonder closed the festival on 23 May.

Najwa Karam's performance was the first in Morocco; it attracted about 60,000 spectators. Warda Al-Jazairia was granted the "Wissam Royal".

2010 
The ninth edition of Mawazine took place from 21 May to 29 May 2010. Elton John and B.B. King performed at the OLM Souissi stage on 26 and 27 May respectively. Julio Iglesias performed on 23 May. Sting closed the 10-day festival with a performance on Saturday, 29 May 2010. Other performers at the 10-day festival included Mika, Harry Connick Jr., Thievery Corporation, Al Jarreau, Deolinda, Angélique Kidjo and Carlos Santana.

The festival also brought famous Arab singers such as Najwa Karam, Tamer Hosny, Elissa, Wael Jassar, Majida El Roumi, Myriam Fares, Rami Ayach.

The Generation Mawazine competition launches the music career of promising young talent. This artistic competition, which has been run since 2006 as a fringe activity to the festival, sets out to find the talent of tomorrow and offers them a major springboard into the music business. Open to all styles of music, this competition gives the stage to new young talents and is judged along 3 predefined categories: rap/hip hop, fusion/neo pop and electronic music. This initiative gives unknown bands the opportunity to perform in front of the general public and media in a professional setting. The winning groups see their career launched in Morocco, produce an album and perform at the following year's festival as established artists.

2011 
The tenth edition was held from 20 May to 28 May 2011 at the OLM Souissi. The show was opened on the Friday with traditional and international performers. Notable performances which followed were Kanye West and Spaniard Ivica pica on the 21st and the English girl group Sugababes on the 22nd. The following days saw legends like Yusuf Islam, Quincy Jones, Joe Cocker and Lionel Richie take on the big stage. The event was again lightened when it had Shakira alongside Swiss DJ and producer Yves Larock on the last day. Shakira's performance has gained over 200,000 audiences

2012 
The eleventh edition was held from 18 May to 26 May 2012 at the OLM Souissi as well as other stages on Rabat. The show was opened on the Friday with LMFAO during their Sorry For Party Rocking Tour. Also other following performances by Pitbull (Planet Pit World Tour), Evanescence (Evanescence Tour), Scorpions (Get Your Sting and Blackout World Tour), Jimmy Cliff, Nigel Kennedy, Khaled, Gloria Gaynor (in Mohammed V theatre), Lenny Kravitz who spent his birthday on stage, and without forgetting the epic finale: The historical performance by the American diva Mariah Carey (exclusive concert "doesn't belong to any of her tours").

House DJs were Yolanda Be Cool and DJ Abdel.

2013 
Mawazine took place from 24 May to 1 June.

International stars in OLM Souissi stage : Rihanna opened the festival as a part of her Diamonds World Tour; she made history by performing to one of the largest crowds of all time, performing in front of 150,000 people. This was a standoff with the Shakira's 2011 performance in terms of the number of audiences. Other artists included Jessie J (Nice to Meet You Tour), MIKA, Sexion d'Assaut, The Jacksons (Unity Tour), David Guetta, Deep Purple (Now What? World Tour), Enrique Iglesias during his (Enrique Iglesias India Tour) featuring the Moroccan-Swedish pop star Loreen, R&B singer Cee-Lo Green and Taio Cruz.

Arab (oriental) stars in Nahda stage : Day 1) Walid Taoufic. Day 2) Mouhcine Salahdine, Sherine Abdel Wahab, Farid Ghennam. Day 3) Bouchra Khalid, Mohamed Mounir. Day 4) Rabab, Cheb Mami. Day 5) Abed, Najwa Karam. Day 6) Zakaria Ghafouli, Assi El Hellani, Mourad Bouriki. Day 7) Shada Hassoun, Ahlam. Day 8) Hatim Ammor, Houda Saad. Day 8) Leila Al Maghribiya, Ahmed Chawki, Tamer Housni.

Moroccan scene in Salé stage : Siham, Jil Ghiwan Jalal, Ghiwane Salwan, LooNope, Jbara, Mjid Bekkas, Aouatif, Mohamed Anbari, Fatim Zahra Laaroussi, Atika Ammar, Numedia et Mallal, Izenzaren Abdelhadi, M.boy, Barry, Casa Crew, Hamid Kasri, Chaht Man, H-Kayne, Don Bigg, Ben Moussa, Hajib, Rachid Lamrini, Mohammed Iskandar, Najat Atabou, Tarik Laamirat, Said Mouskir, Hamid Hadri.

Other stars in so many other stages : Haj Youness, Amir Ali, Leila Lamrini, Tinariwen, African United, Gnawa Diffusion, Amadou & Meriem, Blitz The Ambassador, George Benson, Bond Girls, Sandra Nkaké, Lotfi Bouchnak, Abdelwahab Doukkali, Patrizia Laquidara, Ensemble Dragon.

2014 
Mawazine was held this year from 30 May until 7 June.
Many artists performed starting with Justin Timberlake, for the opening (The 20/20 Experience World Tour) on 30 May which marked his first performance in Morocco, Jason Derülo as part of Tattoos World Tour on 31 May, the mythic French hip-hop group IAM on 1 June, the Belgian house producer and singer Stromae promoting his new album Racine Carrée on 2 June, Kool & the Gang on 3 June, the R&B sensation Ne-Yo on 4 June.Robert Plant the former vocalist of one of the best rock bands ever Led Zeppelin with his new founded band The Sensational Space Shifters on 5 June, the Latino icon Ricky Martin on 6 June, and the finale of this season the strong-voiced R&B diva Alicia Keys on 7 June.

2015
This year's edition of Mawazine Festival is set to new records of attendance. 160,000 people attended the concert of American singer Jennifer Lopez at the opening of the festival, and 180,000 people attended Pharrell Williams concert on Saturday, May 30. The concert of DJ Avicii attracted over 200,000 festival-goers, on Monday, June 1 at the OLM Soussi stage of Rabat, as part of the 14th Mawazine Festival-Rhythms of the World, according to the organizers.

2016

The 15th edition of Mawazine took place from 20 May to 28 May 2016. American singer Chris Brown and Australian rapper Iggy Azalea both performed at the OLM Souissi stage on 20 and 21 May respectively. Pitbull performed for 130 000 fans, and Saad Lamjerrad performed for 140 000 people in the Nahda stage. The Dutch DJ Hardwell also performed in the festival for 180 000 people. The vocalist Christina Aguilera broke record with having over 250,000 people attend and she closed the festival on May 28.

2017
The 16th edition of Mawazine took place on 12 May to 20 May 2017.

Line-ups

Set lists

2018
The 17th edition of Mawazine took place on 22 to 30 June 2018.

Line-ups

Set lists

2019
The 18th edition of Mawazine took place on 21 to 29 June 2019.
Line-ups

2020
 
The 19th Edition of Mawazine was scheduled to take place from 19 to 27 June 2020, but was cancelled due to the COVID-19 pandemic.

See also
 15th edition of Mawazine Festival

References

External links 

 Official site 

2009 in Morocco
Music festivals in Morocco
Tourist attractions in Morocco
World music festivals
Rabat
Corruption in Morocco
Entertainment events in Morocco
Electronic music festivals in Morocco
Music festivals established in 2001
Spring (season) events in Morocco